Show Out may refer to:
 "Show Out" (Juicy J song), 2013
 "Show Out" (Kid Cudi, Skepta and Pop Smoke song), 2020
 "Show Out" (Roscoe Dash song), 2010
 "Show Out" (Unk song), 2008
 "Show Out", a song by Akon from his 2004 album Trouble